Castries Comprehensive Secondary School is a secondary school located in Vide Bouteille, Castries, Saint Lucia.

The school opened in 1974. It was donated by the Canadian government.

Notable alumni
 Sarah Flood-Beaubrun, former Minister of Home Affairs
 Lenard Montoute, Minister of Youth and Sports and MP for Gros Islet (2006–2011)

References

Buildings and structures in Castries
Educational institutions established in 1974
Schools in Saint Lucia
1974 establishments in the British Empire